"I Wouldn't Normally Do This Kind of Thing" is a song by English synth-pop duo Pet Shop Boys from their fifth studio album, Very (1993). The song describes a person normally hesitant to unwind and show his feelings, who—because of some event in his life—suddenly becomes willing to loosen up. It was released in the United Kingdom on 29 November 1993 as the album's third single, reaching number 13 on the UK Singles Chart. In the United States, where it was released in January 1994, it reached number two on the Billboard Hot Dance Club Play chart.

Critical reception
Larry Flick from Billboard wrote, "PSB's lauded Very project spawns another club winner as they combine their patented pop/disco electro-grooves with sharp, clever lyrics. The hook is quite memorable, while a plethora of trance-ish remixes is right in the pocket of current dance trends. Lively album version also is a total joy, and deserves more than a just cursory push from EMI's pop promotion department." Dave Sholin from the Gavin Report said, "It's impossible to hear Chris Lowe and Neil Tennant's trademark sound and not believe this pair has great fun making their music." He added that the music video "recalls the days when Twiggy set fashion trends." 

James Masterton praised the track in his weekly UK chart commentary, stating that the duo "have picked the other standout track" from the album after "Go West", adding that it "is far and away the happiest, most barking mad pop single they have released in their seven year career and is all the better for it." He concluded, "Alright, so I like it, but it deserves to be big." Alan Jones from Music Week rated it four out of five, naming it one of the "standout tracks" of the album. He felt that it "is tweaked into even better shape by the Beatmasters and DJ Pierre, and judging from the artwork, the video should be a hoot." He also complimented it as "one of the hottest records of the winter." James Hamilton from the RM Dance Update described it as "swirling pure disco". Jonathan Bernstein from Spin commented, ""I feel like taking all my clothes off dancing to the rite of spring", exults Neil Tennant on "I Wouldn't Normally Do This Kind of Thing", and you know he ain't giving a shout-out to the Dischord noisemakers."

Music video
A music video was produced to promote the single, directed by Howard Greenhalgh. It was A-listed on Germany's VIVA in March 1994.

Remixes and B-sides
The song was extensively remixed by the Beatmasters for its release as a single, with a new intro replacing the house piano of the album version. Tennant and Lowe came to prefer aspects of this remix and particularly the new intro, playing it on their Electric tour and including a version of the song with it on their PopArt greatest hits compilation (see below).

The single release was bolstered by a large amount of bonus material available across a wide range of formats, on top of the nine remixes commissioned. The main B-side is "Too Many People", but the single also featured remixes of Please tracks "Violence" and "West End Girls".

Packaging
In the UK, the first CD single came in a rubber sleeve, that held both CD one and two. This was very similar to the packaging for Very Relentless. As with the previous singles from Very, the duo donned new outfits for the single's promotional campaign. Chris featured in a blonde wig with a pink and white costume, while Neil was adorned in a brunette wig and darker clothing.

Track listings

 UK 7-inch and cassette single, Australasian cassette single
 "I Wouldn't Normally Do This Kind of Thing" – 4:45
 "Too Many People" – 4:19

 UK 12-inch single
A1. "I Wouldn't Normally Do This Kind of Thing" (extended nude mix) – 7:49
A2. "I Wouldn't Normally Do This Kind of Thing" (Grandballroom dub) – 6:32
B1. "West End Girls" (Sasha remix) – 7:45
B2. "West End Girls" (Sasha dub) – 8:16

 UK 12-inch single (DJ Pierre remixes)
A1. "I Wouldn't Normally Do This Kind of Thing" (DJ Pierre Wild Pitch mix) – 8:22
A2. "I Wouldn't Normally Do This Kind of Thing" (DJ Pierre Wild Tribal Beats) – 3:49
B1. "I Wouldn't Normally Do This Kind of Thing" (DJ Pierre club mix) – 7:10
B2. "I Wouldn't Normally Do This Kind of Thing" (DJ Pierre Wild Pitch dub) – 7:45

 UK CD1
 "I Wouldn't Normally Do This Kind of Thing" – 4:45
 "I Wouldn't Normally Do This Kind of Thing" (extended nude mix) – 7:49
 "I Wouldn't Normally Do This Kind of Thing" (Wild Pitch mix) – 8:22
 "I Wouldn't Normally Do This Kind of Thing" (Grandballroom mix) – 6:39
 "I Wouldn't Normally Do This Kind of Thing" (Wild Pitch dub) – 7:45

 UK CD2 and Australasian CD single
 "I Wouldn't Normally Do This Kind of Thing" – 3:04
 "Too Many People" – 4:19
 "Violence" (Haçienda version) – 4:58
 "West End Girls" (Sasha remix) – 7:45

 European CD single
 "I Wouldn't Normally Do This Kind of Thing" – 3:04
 "West End Girls" (Sasha remix) – 7:45

 US maxi-CD single
 "I Wouldn't Normally Do This Kind of Thing" (album version) – 3:04
 "I Wouldn't Normally Do This Kind of Thing" (club mix) – 7:10
 "I Wouldn't Normally Do This Kind of Thing" (Wild Pitch mix) – 8:22
 "I Wouldn't Normally Do This Kind of Thing" (extended nude mix) – 7:48
 "West End Girls" (Sasha mix) – 7:45
 "Violence" (Haçienda version) – 4:58
 "Too Many People" – 4:19

 US 12-inch single
A1. "I Wouldn't Normally Do This Kind of Thing" (club mix) – 7:10
A2. "I Wouldn't Normally Do This Kind of Thing" (Grand Ballroom dub) – 6:30
A3. "I Wouldn't Normally Do This Kind of Thing" (album version) – 3:04
B1. "I Wouldn't Normally Do This Kind of Thing" (extended nude mix) – 7:48
B2. "West End Girls" (Sasha mix) – 7:45
 The label lists the Grand Ballroom dub but instead has the Grand Ballroom mix

 US cassette single
 "I Wouldn't Normally Do This Kind of Thing" (album version) – 3:04
 "I Wouldn't Normally Do This Kind of Thing" (7-inch mix) – 4:45

Charts

Weekly charts

Year-end charts

References

1992 songs
1993 singles
Music videos directed by Howard Greenhalgh
Parlophone singles
Pet Shop Boys songs
Songs written by Chris Lowe
Songs written by Neil Tennant